Purple Book may refer to:
 The Purple Book (Labour Party), a collection of essays by Labour politicians
 Compendium of Macromolecular Nomenclature, published by IUPAC
 Purple Book, one of the Rainbow Books, defining the double-density compact disc standard